City of Rocks may refer to:

 City of Rocks National Reserve, Idaho, USA 
 City of Rocks State Park, New Mexico, USA